The cuisine of Kosovo is a representative of the cuisine of the Balkans and consists of traditional dishes by ethnic groups native to Kosovo. Due to ethnic connections with Albania, it has been significantly influenced by Albanian cuisine and has adopted elements of other Balkan countries.

Bread, dairy, meat, fruits and vegetables are important staples in Kosovan cuisine. With diversity of recipes, the Kosovan daily cuisine adjusts well to the country's occasional hot summers and the frequent long winters. As a result of its continental climate, fresh vegetables are consumed in summer while pickles throughout autumn and winter.
 
Breakfast in Kosovo is usually light, consisting primarily of a croissant with coffee, sandwiches, scrambled eggs, omelettes, petulla or toast with salami, processed cheese, lettuce and tea. Cereals with milk, waffles, pretzels and homemade pancakes with honey or marmalade are also frequently consumed especially by children.

Dishes 

Common dishes include pies, flija, stuffed peppers, legume, sarma, kebab/qebapa etc. Notwithstanding, the cuisine varies slightly between different regions of the country. 
 
The most common dishes during the winter time in Kosovo contain pickled items like sauerkraut, green tomatoes, cucumbers, cauliflower, and condiments such as ajvar (hot or mild red peppers) which is usually seasoned in early autumn. They do also form popular appetizers throughout the year.

Bread

Varieties of bread are available throughout the country. Notably: pitalka, pita, cornbread (also known as "Leqenik"), kifli and whole wheat bread among others.

Pies
Pies in Kosovo are known as "trejte", or "pite". A variety of pies are common: 

 Kollpite- a baked crust with nothing inside and covered with yogurt 
 Burek- also known as pie in Albania. Byrek is made of pastry layers filled with minced meat, white cheese or spinach.
 Bakllasarm - a salty pie with yoghurt and garlic covering
 Kungullore- savory pastry with pumpkin filling 
 Pite me Spanaq- savory pastry with spinach filling, also known as Spanakopita
 Leqenik, known also as Kryelanë (Krelanë) 
 Resenik - cabbage pie 
 Purrenik - leek pie 
 Hithenik - nettle pie

Salads

Typical salad ingredients include tomatoes, onion, garlic, pepper, cucumber, potato, cabbage, lettuce, carrots, and beans.
 Potato salad
 Tarator - a traditional salad made with cucumbers, garlic and yogurt. Very popular dish for summer.
 Tomato and cucumber salad
 Dried nettle salad
 Bean salad
 Shope salad - a simple salad made of tomato, cucumber, onions and white cheese.

Main dishes

Tavë Prizreni is a traditional regional casserole from the southern city of Prizren. It is made with lamb, eggplants, green peppers, onions, tomatoes and is served hot. Sarma is also another popular lunch dish which (although not limited to) consists of minced meat wrapped with cabbage or vine leaves.
 Stuffed peppers - with meat, rice and vegetables
 Lasagne - alternated with sauces and various other ingredients 
 Qebapa - small grilled meat skinless sausages made of lamb and beef mix; served with onions, sour cream, ajvar and pitalka bread
 Sarma- rolled vine or cabbage leaves
 Pilaf- Rice meal similar to risotto
 Pasulj - Soup made of usually white beans. It is prepared with beef and paprika.
 Suxhuk - A dry, spicy and fermented sausage.
 Tavë  - a traditional dish with lamb chops 
 Tavë Kosi - baked lamb with yogurt

Fish
The most popular fish dishes constitute of fried freshwater fish like zander and carp. A speciality is considered the tavë krapi, carp cooked in a pot, more widely used in cities around the Dukagjini valley, notably Gjakova because of its relation with Shkodër. The garnish is composed of garlic, bay leaf, tomato, parsley.

Desserts

Traditional Kosovan desserts are often made with sorbet which is enhanced with lemon or vanilla flavour. The mainstream pastries include Baklava (regional), Cremeschnitte, Pudding, Crêpe, Tulluma, Tespishte, Rovani, etc.

 Baklava is a rich, sweet pastry made of layers of filo pastry filled with chopped nuts and sweetened with syrup or honey. 
 Rice pudding is a dish made from rice mixed with water or milk and sometimes other ingredients such as cinnamon and raisins. Different variants are used for either desserts or dinners. When used as a dessert, it is commonly combined with a sweetener such as sugar.
 Cremeschnitte is a chantilly and custard cream cake. 
 Kek a similar form of sweet dessert to cake. 
 Havell is a flour-based sweet confection of non Kosovan origin. 
 Sheqerpare
 Tespishte

Drinks 

Drinking coffee is part of a big tradition in Kosovo. It is widely consumed and served everywhere at cafés, bars or restaurants. There are several varieties of coffee popular in Kosovo, which include instant coffee, brewed coffee, turkish coffee and Italian coffee.

The most popular traditional drink in Kosovo is Rasoj which is made of a fermented red cabbage. Another popular beverages include boza, lemonade, kompot (usually drank during the autumn and made with seasonal fruit such as quince), beer, as well as coffee and teas. 
 
 Rasoj - Probiotic fermented red cabbage juice consumed mostly during the winter
 Rakia - A popular regional fruit brandy alcoholic beverage. In Kosovo it is typically made from grapes, although some variations exist.
 Boza - A soft drink made of maize and wheat flour. Notorious for being a refreshing summer drink.
 Ajron - A mix of yogurt, water and salt.
 Beer - Some of Kosovo's local beers are "Birra Peja", "Birra Ereniku", "Birra Prishtina", etc. 
 Compote - A non-alcoholic sweet beverage that may be served hot or cold, depending on tradition and season. 
 Coffee - drip brewed coffee, percolated, espresso (such as macchiato and cappuccino), a variety of instant coffee, etc.  
 Tea - The most popular teas are mountain tea, rose hip tea, black tea and peppermint tea.

See also 

 Culture of Albania
 Culture of Kosovo
 Balkan cuisine 
 Albanian cuisine
 Kosovo Albanians
 Kosovo Serbs
 Serbian cuisine

Annotations

References

External links 

 
Cuisine
Albanian culture
Albanian cuisine
Balkan cuisine